Byrsophyllum ellipticum is a species of plant in the family Rubiaceae. It is endemic to Sri Lanka.

References

Flora of Sri Lanka
ellipticum
Vulnerable plants
Taxonomy articles created by Polbot